The Niagara Falls Public Library is a public library system in the city of Niagara Falls, New York. In 2018 a Niagara Falls councillor proposed establishing a library authority.

Branches
 Earl W. Brydges Building - 1425 Main Street
 LaSalle Branch - 8728 Buffalo Avenue

The Earl W. Brydges Building was designed by Paul Rudolph and built by Albert Elia Company.

References

External links

Niagara Falls, New York
Public libraries in New York (state)